The Zurrieq Half Marathon is a road running event held every November in Malta, Europe.  The race starts from the Żurrieq Main Square and finishes in the same location after passing through the picturesque towns of Safi, Kirkop, Mqabba, Qrendi and Siġġiewi.

Course records
 Men - Christian Nemeth (Belgian) - 1:09:36 in 2006
 Women - Carol Galea (Malta) - 1:20:37 in 2004

External links
Official website

Half marathons
Żurrieq